The National Taiwan College of Performing Arts (NTCPA) is a public college located in Taipei, Taiwan.

The college offers undergraduate and graduate programs in various fields of performing arts, including drama, music, dance, and traditional Chinese performing arts. Students can choose from a wide range of programs, such as Acting, Directing, Playwriting, Dance, Vocal Performance, Instrumental Performance, Musicology, and Traditional Chinese Performing Arts.  

The college also offers a number of interdisciplinary programs that allow students to combine their interests in different fields of the performing arts.

History
It was known as Fu Sheng (Fu Xing Ju Xiao) or Lu Kwan Peking Opera school. Although called a Peking Opera school, students actually learned Taiwanese opera, sung in Hokkien dialect rather than Mandarin. Notable students included Lu Feng, Chiang Sheng, Charlie Chin, Philip Kwok, Angela Mao and James Tien who subsequently worked in the Hong Kong film industry.

On 1 July 1999, the National Fu Hsing Dramatic Arts Academy merged with the National Kuo Kuang Academy of Arts to establish National Taiwan Junior College of Performing Arts.

Faculties
 Department of Jing Ju (for Peking opera)
 Department of Taiwanese Opera (for Taiwanese opera)
 Department of Hakka Opera (for Hakka opera)
 Department of Acrobatics and Dance
 Department of Traditional Music
 Department of Theater Arts

Notable alumni
 Chiang Tsu-ping, actress and television host
 Cynthia Khan, actress
 Lin Mei-hsiu, actress and television host
 Lu Feng, actor and action director

See also
 List of universities in Taiwan

References

External links

  

1999 establishments in Taiwan
Schools of Chinese opera
Drama schools in Taiwan
Educational institutions established in 1999
Music schools in Taiwan
Universities and colleges in Taipei
Universities and colleges in Taiwan